Anastasia Novitskaya  (1790 – 1822) was a Russian Empire ballerina.  She was engaged at the Imperial Russian Ballet in 1806-1822, where she was a soloist and regarded as an elite member during her career. She was trained by Charles Didelot, and acted as an instructor in dance at the Smolny Institute.

References

1790 births
1822 deaths
Ballerinas from the Russian Empire
19th-century ballet dancers from the Russian Empire